Pochy Familia y Su Cocoband, also called Cocoband, was a leading Dominican Republic merengue
group in the 1990s.  The group was founded in 1989 by Alfonso "Pochy" Vásquez (September 17, 1966), and had a number of hit albums with the 
Kubaney label: 
 
Group members in the early years included Kinito Méndez Bobby Rafael, Elvis Class & Silvio Sosa. Each of whom went on to a career of their own.

Hit songs by the group include "La Faldita", "Chupo Yo, Chupa Tú", "El Hombre Llego Parao", "Salsa Con Coco". The phrase "¡Pero Con Coco!" (But With Coco!) was a favorite refrain in several songs.

Discography 

 Cocoband (1989)
 La Faldita (1990)
 Llegaron los Cocotuces (1991)
 Los Cocotuces... Pero con Coco! (1991)
 El Arrollador (1992)
 ...La Coco Es la Coco (1993)
 El Hombre Llegó Parao (1995) (Are we sure about this, folks? Isn't this a song from the 1995 album, "Pochy Y Su Cocoband"?)
 Temible (1995)
 El Ombliguito (1996)
 Ponle Sazón! (1998)
 Tú Sabes... No Te Hagas (1999)
 Con Más Sabor a... Coco (2001)
 La Barriguita (2004)
 Coco Reencuentro (2008)
 Coco de Calle (2013)

Compilations 

 Grandes Éxitos de la Cocoband Vol. 1 (1994)
 Grandes Éxitos de la Cocoband Vol. 2 (1994) 
 Coco de Oro (2007)
 A Man and His Music: ...¡Pero Con Coco! (2007)

Singles 

 Lotomanía (1988)
 Canciones Cocománticas (1993)
 Navidad con Coco (1998)

Remixes 

 Remixes (1989)
 Coco Mixes (1998)

Cassette 

 Grandes Éxitos de Pochi y Su Cocoband (1997)

Live 

 En México (1996)
 En Vivo (2002)

Reedition 

 Merengue Total! (1991)

References

Dominican Republic musical groups
Merengue music groups
Musical groups established in 1988